Mounir A. Farah is a professor Emeritus of education and Middle East Studies at the University of Arkansas-Fayetteville. Before that, he taught history and social science at New York University and Western Connecticut State University, as well as being a lecturer at international teacher's conferences and has a Ph.D. A strong advocate for history for, by, and about the Middle East, he served as a consultant for the Ministry of Education in Jordan and as a board member and past president of the Middle East Outreach Council. As an award-winning History Scholar-Teacher, he has written several history texts for Glencoe and the National Geographic Society, among them Global Insights and World History, The Human Experience.
Time away from work is spent with his wife and kids.

References

Living people
University of Arkansas faculty
21st-century American historians
American male non-fiction writers
Year of birth missing (living people)
21st-century American male writers